Nwanedi Dam is an arch type dam located on the Nwanedi River, part of the Limpopo River basin. It is located 48 km southeast of Musina, Limpopo Province, South Africa. It was established in 1964 and serves mainly for irrigation purposes. The hazard potential of the dam has been ranked high (3).

It is a twin dam, the Luphephe Dam is located just east of the dam, less than 0.25 km away.

See also
List of reservoirs and dams in South Africa

References 

 List of South African Dams from the Department of Water Affairs and Forestry (South Africa)

Dams in South Africa
Dams completed in 1964